Cristina Nicolau (9 August 1977, in Bucharest – 5 December 2017) was a Romanian triple jumper.

Her personal best jump was 14.70 metres, achieved in August 1999 in Gothenburg. This mark places her jump third in the all-time Romanian woman triple jumper record list, only behind Rodica Mateescu and Adelina Gavrilă. Cristina Nicolau died on 5 December 2017, aged 40.

Achievements

References

External links

1977 births
2017 deaths
Romanian female triple jumpers
Romanian female long jumpers
Athletes (track and field) at the 2000 Summer Olympics
Olympic athletes of Romania
Universiade medalists in athletics (track and field)
World Athletics Championships athletes for Romania
Universiade bronze medalists for Romania
Medalists at the 1997 Summer Universiade
Sportspeople from Bucharest